Sir David Anthony Evennett (born 3 June 1949, Romford) is a Conservative politician. He was elected as Member of Parliament (MP) for Bexleyheath and Crayford at the 2005 general election. Previously he was the MP for Erith and Crayford between the 1983 and 1997 general elections. He served as Lord Commissioner of the Treasury from September to October 2022.

Early life
Sir David was educated at Buckhurst Hill County High School and the London School of Economics, where he was awarded an MSc in Economics. He began his career as a teacher at Ilford County High School between 1972 and 1974, from which post he resigned when he was elected to Redbridge London Borough Council (1974–78). From 1974 to 1981 he was also a marine insurance broker at Lloyd's, and he worked as a lecturer in management between 1997 and 2005.

At the 1979 general election he contested the Labour seat of Hackney South and Shoreditch where he came second to Ronald Brown.

Parliamentary career

Erith and Crayford
Sir David was elected as the Conservative MP for Erith and Crayford at the 1983 general election, when he defeated James Wellbeloved who had defected from the Labour Party to the newly formed Social Democrats in 1981. Sir David gained the seat with a majority of 920 votes over Wellbeloved. He remained the MP until the seat was redrawn in boundary changes at the 1997 general election.

In Parliament he joined the Education and Science Select committee in 1986. Following the 1992 general election he was appointed the Parliamentary Private Secretary (PPS) to the Minister of State at the Department for Education, Emily Blatch. 

In 1993, he became the PPS to John Redwood, the Secretary of State for Wales, until 1995 when he was made PPS to the Home Office minister David Maclean, and then PPS to Gillian Shephard at the Department for Education in 1996, where he remained until he was defeated at the 1997 general election.

Bexleyheath and Crayford
He contested the newly drawn Bexleyheath and Crayford seat in 1997, but lost to Labour's Nigel Beard by 3,415 votes. He narrowly lost to Beard again at the 2001 general election but reduced his majority to 1,475. He was re-elected to Parliament for Bexleyheath and Crayford at the 2005 general election, ousting Beard by 4,551 votes. By winning back a seat which, albeit after boundary changes, he had lost in 1997, he became the only MP to have lost his seat in the Labour landslide of 1997, fought the same seat unsuccessfully in 2001 and then to have fought and won it back at the second attempt.

Following his re-election in 2005, he was made a member of the Education & Skills Select Committee and was appointed as an Opposition Whip by Michael Howard, and remained a whip under the new leadership of David Cameron. In January 2009, he was appointed Shadow Minister for Skills in the Conservative Innovation, Universities and Skills team.

At the 2010 general election he was returned with a majority of 10,344, and was appointed PPS to Michael Gove, Secretary of State for Education. In 2012, he was appointed Lord Commissioner of HM Treasury (Government Whip) and remained in the role until January 2018.

In March 2015, he was appointed to the Privy Council of the United Kingdom and therefore granted the title The Right Honourable.

From January 2016 to July 2016, he was the Acting Parliamentary Under-Secretary of State for Sport, Tourism and Heritage, to cover the maternity leave of Tracey Crouch.

On 18 May 2018, it was announced that David Evennett would be knighted.

In July 2019, the new Prime Minister Boris Johnson appointed Evennett as a Vice Chairman of the Conservative Party.

On 6 June 2022, after a vote of no confidence in the leadership of Boris Johnson was called, Evennett announced that he would be supporting the Prime Minister.

Personal life
He married Marilyn Smith in 1975 in Redbridge; the couple have two sons and two grandchildren.

References

External links
 David Evennett -- personal website, davidevennett.org.uk 
 
 "Tourism Minister visits North Tyneside", newsguardian.co.uk
 Politics , bbc.co.uk

1949 births
Living people
Councillors in the London Borough of Redbridge
Conservative Party (UK) MPs for English constituencies
Alumni of the London School of Economics
UK MPs 1983–1987
UK MPs 1987–1992
UK MPs 1992–1997
UK MPs 2005–2010
UK MPs 2010–2015
UK MPs 2015–2017
UK MPs 2017–2019
UK MPs 2019–present
People from Romford
People educated at Buckhurst Hill County High School
Members of the Privy Council of the United Kingdom
Knights Bachelor
Politicians awarded knighthoods